The Teirei is a river of Mizoram, northeastern India, a tributary of the Tlawng River.

References

Rivers of Mizoram
Rivers of India